Denis Savenkov (born 17 September 1983) is a Belarusian gymnast. He competed at the 2004 Summer Olympics and the 2008 Summer Olympics.

References

External links
 

1983 births
Living people
Belarusian male artistic gymnasts
Olympic gymnasts of Belarus
Gymnasts at the 2004 Summer Olympics
Gymnasts at the 2008 Summer Olympics
Sportspeople from Gomel
21st-century Belarusian people